Walter Steinbauer (20 January 1945 in Dissen am Teutoburger Wald – 28 May 1991) was a West German bobsledder who competed from the late 1960s to the mid-1970s. He won a bronze medal in the four-man event at the 1972 Winter Olympics in Sapporo.

Steinbauer also won four medals in the four-man event at the FIBT World Championships with one gold (1969), one silver (1970, and two bronzes (1971, 1973).

References
 Bobsleigh four-man Olympic medalists for 1924, 1932–56, and since 1964
 Bobsleigh four-man world championship medalists since 1930
 DatabaseOlympics.com profile

1945 births
1991 deaths
Bobsledders at the 1972 Winter Olympics
German male bobsledders
Olympic bobsledders of West Germany
Olympic bronze medalists for West Germany
Olympic medalists in bobsleigh
Medalists at the 1972 Winter Olympics